Bernard Annen Auwen Dowiyogo (14 February 1946 – 9 March 2003) was a Nauruan politician who served as President of Nauru on seven separate occasions. During this time, he also served as a Member of Parliament for the constituency of Ubenide.

Background and early career
Dowiyogo was born in Nauru on 14 February 1946. He first became an elected member of Nauru's 18-seat parliament in 1973. Particularly in his earlier years in the Parliament of Nauru Dowiyogo was seen as an opponent of Nauru's first post-independence President, Hammer DeRoburt. Dowiyogo founded the Nauru Institute of Media and Communications which operated between 1984 and 1996 but due to financial difficulties was closed in 1997.

President of Nauru
He served his first term as President from 1976 to 1978 after ousting Hammer DeRoburt. Over the next 25 years, Dowiyogo served as President several times, for periods as long as six years (1989–1995) and as short as 8 days (in January 2003). He was the youngest president in Nauru. During the 1980s, he sharply criticized France and the United States for atomic weapons testing in Nauru.

In 1990, Dowiyogo was awarded the New Zealand 1990 Commemoration Medal.

Dowiyogo closed Nauru's offshore banks in 2003 when the US alleged they were used for moneylaundering.

Death
He died in office in March 2003 (having been president on this occasion since January 2003) at George Washington University Hospital in Washington, D.C. from heart complications brought on by his struggle with diabetes, a common ailment on Nauru. At the time of the deterioration of his final illness, he had been engaged in protracted negotiations with the United States Government.

Family
Dowiyogo married on 14 December 1968. Dowiyogo had eight children with his wife, Christina Dowiyogo (died March 2008): 
Clara Augusta Alefaio (née Dowiyogo) who served at the Nauru education Department but now resides in New Zealand
Valdon Kape Dowiyogo, who served as Speaker of the Parliament of Nauru, 
Jesaulenko Dowiyogo, who served as diplomat and later Chairman of the Board of Directors of the Nauru Fisheries and Marine Resources Authority, 
Junior Dowiyogo who served as Commissioner for Police in the Nauru Police Force 
Peter Jason Dowiyogo who worked at the Nauru Post Office, David Dowiyogo who is employed at the Republic of Nauru Hospital 
Jeff Dowiyogo who currently resides in Australia 
Zita Dowiyogo who now Serves at the Nauru Immigration Office.

References

1946 births
2003 deaths
Deaths from diabetes
Democratic Party of Nauru politicians
Members of the Parliament of Nauru
Nauruan politicians of Japanese descent
Nauruan people of i-Kiribati descent
Presidents of Nauru
Finance Ministers of Nauru
20th-century Nauruan politicians
21st-century Nauruan politicians